The 1952 Bucknell Bison football team was an American football team that represented Bucknell University as an independent during the 1952 college football season. 

In its sixth season under head coach Harry Lawrence, the team compiled a 6–3 record. Harry McSorley and Abe Powelson were the team captains.

The team played its home games at Memorial Stadium in Lewisburg, Pennsylvania.

Schedule

References

Bucknell
Bucknell Bison football seasons
Bucknell Bison football